Pedro Ferreira da Silva Filho (born October 24, 1966) is a former decathlete from Brazil. He won the gold medal in the men's decathlon event at the 1991 Pan American Games in Havana, Cuba, and competed for his native country at the 1992 Summer Olympics.

His personal best of 8266 points, set in Walnut, California in 1987, lasted twenty-five years as the Brazilian record. Luiz Alberto de Araújo bettered this mark at the 2012 Brazilian championships. He won three straight decathlon title at the South American Junior Championships in Athletics from 1983 to 1985. He was also the silver medallist at the 1984 Pan American Junior Athletics Championships.

International competitions

References

sports-reference

1966 births
Living people
Brazilian decathletes
Brazilian male athletes
Olympic athletes of Brazil
Athletes (track and field) at the 1992 Summer Olympics
Pan American Games athletes for Brazil
Pan American Games medalists in athletics (track and field)
Pan American Games gold medalists for Brazil
Athletes (track and field) at the 1987 Pan American Games
Athletes (track and field) at the 1991 Pan American Games
Athletes (track and field) at the 1995 Pan American Games
World Athletics Championships athletes for Brazil
Medalists at the 1991 Pan American Games
20th-century Brazilian people